Jakob Karlberg (born 13 September 1994 in Alingsås) is a Swedish singer. In 2015 he signed with Sony Music, releasing the song ”Fan va bra”. The song peaked at number 7 on the Swedish single chart. He participated in Melodifestivalen 2020 with the song "Om du tror att jag saknar dig", which peaked at number 70 on the Swedish single chart.

Discography

Singles

References

Living people
1994 births
People from Alingsås
Swedish male singers
Melodifestivalen contestants of 2020